Justin Walker may refer to:
 Justin Walker (actor), American actor
 Justin Walker (footballer) (born 1975), English former professional footballer 
 Justin Walker (Brothers & Sisters), a character from Brothers & Sisters
 Justin R. Walker (born 1982), United States federal judge on Court of Appeals for the District of Columbia Circuit.